The International Middleware Conference brings together academic and industrial delegates who have an interest in the development, optimisation, evaluation and evolution of middleware.

History
The first instance of the Middleware conference was held in 1998. Since 2003 the conference has been run annually. Many recent conference events have been ACM/IFIP/USENIX supported events.

Conference structure
Middleware uses a single-track conference program, although it includes a growing number of submission categories. As of 2013, these include:
Research papers
Experimentation and deployment papers
Big ideas papers

The conference also includes:
Tutorials
Demonstrations and posters
A doctoral workshop

A number (six, in 2012) of workshops are typically co-located with the main conference.

See also
List of computer science conferences

References

External links
http://www.middleware-conference.org/
https://web.archive.org/web/20130511173841/http://2013.middleware-conference.org/

Computer science conferences
Middleware